The following lists events that happened during 2016 in Switzerland.

Incumbents
Federal Council:
Doris Leuthard 
Guy Parmelin
Ueli Maurer
Didier Burkhalter 
Johann Schneider-Ammann (President)
Simonetta Sommaruga 
Alain Berset

Events

May
 May 16 – The Loud House was premiered in Switzerland along with France.

 May 26 – The Loud House's "Overnight Success" was premiered along with "Ties That Bind" in Switzerland.

June
 June 1 – The Gotthard Base Tunnel, the world's longest and deepest railway tunnel, is opened following two decades of construction work.

December
December 18 / December 19 – An attacker murders one man before shooting 3 people at an Islamic center in downtown Zurich.

Notes and references 

 
2010s in Switzerland 
Switzerland
Years of the 21st century in Switzerland